Royds  may refer to:
Royds, Bradford, a ward in Bradford Metropolitan District in West Yorkshire, England
Cape Royds, a dark rock cape forming the west extremity of Ross Island,
High Royds Hospital, former psychiatric hospital south of the village of Menston, West Yorkshire, England
Royds Hall School, comprehensive school in Huddersfield, West Yorkshire, England
High Royds railway station, former station near Barnsley on the South Yorkshire Railway
High Royds Hospital Railway, short railway connecting the West Riding County Asylum near Leeds in West Yorkshire with the Midland Railway
 Royds (surname)